Eva Suárez (born 21 May 1960) is a Spanish sports shooter. She competed at the 1988 Summer Olympics and the 1992 Summer Olympics.

References

1960 births
Living people
Spanish female sport shooters
Olympic shooters of Spain
Shooters at the 1988 Summer Olympics
Shooters at the 1992 Summer Olympics
Place of birth missing (living people)
20th-century Spanish women